Hangzhou Normal University Medical College is a university in Hangzhou, Zhejiang Province, People's Republic of China.

It has grown out of the former Hangzhou School of Zhejiang Medical University which was founded in 1979. In 1994, the school was renamed Hangzhou Medical Junior College. In 2000, it combined with Hangzhou Nursing School (founded in 1917). In July 2001, it was merged into Hangzhou Teachers College. In March 2007, it was renamed Hangzhou Normal University Medical College as Hangzhou Teachers College was renamed Hangzhou Normal University.

The Medical College has 260 staff members, among whom 39 are professors and 80 are associate professors, including 3 doctoral supervisors and 30 master student supervisors. At present 2405 full-time undergraduate and master students are studying at the Medical College.

Schools and departments 
Medical College consists of three schools & one department: 
 School of Clinical Medicine
 School of Nursing
 School of Medicine and Health Management
 Department of Basic Medicine

M.B.B.S 
Duration: 5 Years (4 Years study + 1 Year internship)

Course 

Anatomy, Physiology, Biochemistry, Histology, Embryology, Pathology, Pharmacology, Forensic Medicine, Microbiology, Community Medicine, Clinical Orientation, Internal Medicine, Surgery, Diagnostics, Pediatrics, Gynecology & Obstetrics, Otolaryngology, Neurology, Infectious Diseases, Emergency Medicine.

Hospitals 
Medical College has 2 affiliated general hospital, 6 non-directly affiliated hospitals and 39 teaching hospitals

Hangzhou City People's Hospital 

After more than half a century, Affiliated Hospital of Hangzhou Normal University (Hangzhou City People's Hospital) is a financial health care, teaching, research, prevention and health care among three general hospitals in Zhejiang province. It is the national first-class units at level III, which have 1000 beds altogether. There are count for 200 million advanced and precise apparatus and equipment. In 2008 year, a new 23-storey building has been completed and put into use for medical care, teaching and medicinal services in the hospital. More than 200 experts are working in hospital. Hospital has 36 clinical departments and 13 medical technology departments
The hospital has MRI, 32-slice CT, all-digital flat-panel angiography (DSA), DR, and CR, the central monitoring system, the Zeiss operating microscope, an artificial kidney, video laryngoscope, Gastroscopy, colonoscopy the Nuctech Excimer Laser, the United States and other imported advanced medical instruments and equipment to meet the needs of the subjects of diagnosis, treatment and teaching.

Research centres 
 Department of Basic Medical Experimental Center
 Clinical Experiment Center
 Clinical skills training center
 Medical Neurobiology Laboratory
 Hangzhou Institute of Cardiovascular Research
 Institute of Nephrology
 Hangzhou radioimmunoassay
 Hangzhou, oral Quality Control Center
 Hangzhou Hospital Infection Quality Control Center

Key professional in Zhejiang Province 

Clinical medicine

Quality courses in Zhejiang Province 

Surgery, Obstetrics, gynecology, Pediatrics,

Key disciplines in Hangzhou City 

Otolaryngology Head and Neck Surgery

Quality courses in Hangzhou City 

Human anatomy, Physiology, Pharmacology

Campus life 
On campus there is a campus infirmary, Canteens, bank ATMs, campus supermarkets, laundries, book stores, etc. The university has various kinds of sports venues and facilities, including stadiums, outdoor courts for playing volleyball, basketball, football, venues for track and field events, swimming pools, gymnasium, etc. open to all students.

Outside Surroundings 

There are some convenient living facilities such as large-scale public hospital, bank, post office, supermarket, cinema, gymnasium, Parks and so on around the campus.

Traffic 

Xiasha has a very convenient transportation advantage. More than 10 bus routes are put into use from Xiasha to downtown, among which Bus Rapid Transit (BRT) B1 and B4 run every 3 to 5 minutes, and it takes only 30 to 40 minutes to reach the downtown from Xiasha. The BRT buses run between the Huang Long station and Xiasha. The subway line No.1 which is under construction now will be put into use in 2012. Then it will only take 20 minutes or so to reach the city center from Xiasha. The taxi flag-down fare in Xiasha Higher Education Zone is 5 Yuan for the first three kilometers.

Medical schools in China
Universities and colleges in Hangzhou